The Daily Inqilab was pre-Partition Lahore based newspaper. The newspaper was founded by Maulana Ghulam Rasool Mehr and Abdul Majeed Salik. The Daily Inqilab started on 4 April 1927 and was dated 2 April 1927, however, all newspapers printed with date two days ahead. The first newspaper was published with 10 thousand copies. The newspaper was published till 1949.

See also
 Zamindar

References

Urdu-language newspapers published in Pakistan
1927 establishments in India
Defunct newspapers published in Pakistan
1949 disestablishments in Pakistan
Publications established in 1927
Publications disestablished in 1949
Daily newspapers published in Pakistan